Streptomyces panaciradicis is a Gram-positive bacterium species from the genus of Streptomyces which has been isolated from the rhizoplane from a ginseng plant. Streptomyces panaciradicis produces β-glucosidase.

See also 
 List of Streptomyces species

References

Further reading 
 

panaciradicis
Bacteria described in 2014